Petra Babiaková (born 27 July 1977 in Zvolen, Czechoslovakia) is a Slovakian ice hockey defender.

International career
Babiaková was selected for the Slovakia national women's ice hockey team in the 2010 Winter Olympics. She played the second most minutes on her team, but did not record a point. She played in the 2010 Olympic qualifying campaign.

Babiaková also appeared for Slovakia at nine IIHF Women's World Championships, across three levels. Her first appearance came in 2003, where she scored two goals.

Career statistics

International career

References

External links
Eurohockey.com Profile
Sports-Reference Profile

1977 births
Living people
Ice hockey players at the 2010 Winter Olympics
Olympic ice hockey players of Slovakia
Sportspeople from Zvolen
Slovak women's ice hockey defencemen